Boris Godounov (aka Boris Godunov) is a 1989 musical film directed by Andrzej Żuławski and based on the opera of the same name by Modest Mussorgsky and the 1825 play by Alexander Pushkin.

The film features the 1872 version of Mussorgsky's score, although with significant cuts.

Plot
Saint-Petersburg, 1874. Composer Modest Mussorgsky is present at the premiere of his opera Boris Godunov. The curtain opens and the performance begins.

After the death of Czar Fyodor an enormous crowd has gathered before the Kremlin gate. Incited by boyars, the crowd implores Boris Godunov to accept the throne. Boris agrees though he knows that the crown is stained with the blood of Czarevitch Dimitri, the rightful heir to the throne, murdered earlier at Godunov's secret order. At the same time, in a monastery, monk Pimen is finishing his historical chronicle. Asked by the young novice Grigori about Dimitri's mysterious death, Pimen reveals to him the truth about Godunov's involvement. Deeply affected by the monk's tale, Grigori soon flees to Lithuania.

In the Kremlin, Godunov feels increasingly lonely as he is haunted by the visions of the murdered czarevitch. Prince Shuysky informs him that someone who claims to be Czarevitch Dimitri is heading for Moscow to take over the throne. In fact, this is the escaped novice Grigori who has become an impostor in order to win the heart of the Polish beauty Marina Mniszech.

Cast
 Ruggero Raimondi as Boris Godunov
 Delphine Forest/Galina Vishnevskaya as Marina Mnichek
 Pavel Slabý (acting)/Vyacheslav Polozov (singing) as Grigory/Dimitri
 Bernard Lefort/Paul Plishka as Pimène, the hermit
 Pavel Slabý (acting)/Nicolai Gedda as the Innocent
 Kenneth Riegel as Prince Chouisky
 Romuald Tesarowicz as Varlaam, the monk
 National Symphony Orchestra conducted by Mstislav Rostropovich

Production
The film is based on the musical recording of Mussorgsky's opera made in the summer of 1987 in Washington, DC with the participation of several opera stars and the National Symphony Orchestra conducted by Mstislav Rostropovich. The recording was made for Erato Records and cost one million dollars. Producer Daniel Toscan du Plantier invited Andrzej Wajda to do the film version for Erato Films, and when the latter backed out, offered the project to Zulawski. The 7-million-dollar production was filmed in Yugoslavia in February–April 1989. Of the original performers only Ruggero Raimondi, Kenneth Riegel and Romuald Tesarowicz reprised their roles on screen, while the rest of singers was replaced by non-singing actors. Żuławski chose to present the opera as a theatrical performance within the film. However, the director took this approach much further as the camera not only goes through the sets but also regularly exposes the film crew. Zulawski used only less than two hours of the three and a half recorded by Rostropovich, changed the sequence of some scenes and filled the picture with deliberate anachronistic references to the Soviet totalitarian regime.

Controversy
The liberties taken by the director outraged some opera purists and, first of all, the conductor Rostropovich. The latter sued Żuławski demanding to remove certain visual and sound elements from the film. On January 10, 1990, the Paris Court issued a verdict ordering Andrzej Żuławski to insert an announcement in the beginning of the film, mentioning Rostropovich's disapproval of the film version. However, the court confirmed that the choice of images and sounds should remain the prerogative of the filmmaker, though some used by Żuławski "could denaturate the appreciation of the work interpreted by Rostropovich."

Reception
The film received mixed reviews. Variety said "as tumultuous as Mussorgsky's great opera is, Zulawski's galloping camera and manic actors more often compete rather than support or illustrate the music and epic drama." Positif  said "the mise-en-scène, constantly intelligent, gives a privilege to the spectacular nature of the story; it regains the beauty of the opera through the poignant and colorful images. Le Monde remarked: "it's impossible to talk here about "film-opera" in a merely illustrative sense. One should let yourself to be carried by the admirable cinematic work, confirming, as if it was necessary, the Shakespearean temperament of the author of...notable works of the French cinema of the recent years." Phil Powrie called the film "a remarkable achievement, matched only, in my view, by... Jacquot’s Tosca.”

References

External links

1989 films
1980s musical films
French musical films
Spanish musical films
Yugoslav musical films
Films directed by Andrzej Żuławski
Films based on operas
Films based on works by Aleksandr Pushkin
Films set in Russia
Films set in the 1590s
Films set in the 1600s
Cultural depictions of Boris Godunov
Opera films
Films shot in Yugoslavia
1980s French films